Kawasaki may refer to:

Places
Kawasaki, Kanagawa, a Japanese city
Kawasaki-ku, Kawasaki, a ward in Kawasaki, Kanagawa
Kawasaki City Todoroki Arena
Kawasaki Stadium, a multi-sport stadium
Kawasaki, Fukuoka, a Japanese town
Kawasaki, Iwate, a Japanese village
Kawasaki, Miyagi, a Japanese town
Tokyo-Yokohama-Kawasaki, Japanese conurbation

Transportation
Kawasaki Route, a toll road of the Shuto expressway system in Greater Tokyo
Kawasaki line, several lines
Kawasaki station, several stations

Businesses
Kawasaki Heavy Industries (KHI), a Japanese manufacturer of aerospace equipment, ATVs, engines, industrial plants, motorcycles, jet skis, ships, tractors, trains and so on
Kawasaki Heavy Industries Motorcycle & Engine, a division of Kawasaki Heavy Industries
Kawasaki motorcycles
Kawasaki Motors Racing, the European subsidiary of Kawasaki Heavy Industries
Kawasaki Shipbuilding Corporation, the shipbuilding subsidiary of Kawasaki Heavy Industries
Kawasaki Heavy Industries Rolling Stock Company, the railroad division of Kawasaki Heavy Industries
Kawasaki Aerospace Company, the aerospace division of Kawasaki Heavy Industries
Kawasaki Kisen Kaisha or K Line, a Japanese transport company
Kawasaki Steel Corporation, predecessor of JFE Holdings

People
Kawasaki (surname), a Japanese surname

Fictional characters
(Chef) Kawasaki, a Kirby character

Other uses
 Battle of Kawasaki, at Kawasaki, Mutsu, Japan; in 1057 in the Zenkunen War between the Abe clan and Minamoto clan
Kawasaki disease (Kawasaki's), a vascular disease found primarily in young children
Kawasaki Racecourse, a horseracing dirt track, in Kawasaki, Kanagawa, Japan
Shaking rat Kawasaki, the Kawasaki lineage of laboratory rat animals
Kawasaki-type oiler an oil tanker and refueller ship class

See also

Kawasaki Frontale, a football (soccer) club in Kawasaki, Kanagawa
 Verdy Kawasaki, former name of current Tokyo Verdy, a football (soccer) club
 
 
 Kawa (disambiguation)
 Saki (disambiguation)